Duggar may refer to:

 Duggar (region), a cultural and historical region in South Asia

 Duggar family, stars of the reality TV series 19 Kids and Counting
 Jim Bob Duggar, father of the Duggar family and former Arkansas state legislator
 Josh Duggar, son of Jim Bob Duggar and convicted criminal
 Jana Duggar, daughter of Jim Bob Duggar
 Jill Duggar Dillard, daughter of Jim Bob Duggar
 Jessa Duggar Seewald, daughter of Jim Bob Duggar
 Jinger Duggar Vuolo, daughter of Jim Bob Duggar
 Joy-Anna Duggar Forsyth, daughter of Jim Bob Duggar
 Benjamin Minge Duggar (1872–1956), American botanist
 Steven Duggar (born 1993), American major league baseball player

See also
 Dugger (disambiguation)